The 2001–02 Superliga Espanola de Hockey Hielo season was the 28th season of the Superliga Espanola de Hockey Hielo, the top level of ice hockey in Spain. Six teams participated in the league, and FC Barcelona won the championship.

Standings

Playoffs

Semifinal 
 CH Jaca – CH Txuri Urdin 2:1 (3:1, 2:6, 8:2)
 CG Puigcerdà – FC Barcelona 0:2 (3:5, 0:6)

Final 
 CH Jaca – FC Barcelona 2:3 (7:3, 2:8, 7:2, 5:7, 2:4)

External links
Season on hockeyarchives.info

Liga Nacional de Hockey Hielo seasons
Spa
Liga